Emmanuelle Bayamack-Tam (née Garino; born 16 March 1966) is a French writer. She also writes under the pseudonym Rebecca Lighieri. In 2022, she was awarded the Prix Médicis for her novel La Treizième Heure.

Biography
Born in 1966 in Marseille as Emmanuelle Garino, she lives in Villejuif, near Paris. She writes under the surname of her first husband, with whom she has two daughters.

Since 2013, she has also published noir novels under the pseudonym Rebecca Lighieri.

In 2018, she published the novel Arcadia, which received the 2019 Prix du Livre Inter. It was shortlisted for the Prix Femina, Prix Médicis and Prix de Flore. It was also longlisted for the Prix France-Culture and Prix Wepler.

In 2021, she co-wrote the screenplay of Émilie Aussel's first feature film L'Été l'éternité (Our Eternal Summer), which had its world premiere at the 74th Locarno Film Festival.

In 2022, she was awarded the Prix Médicis for her novel La Treizième Heure.

Bibliography

Novels 
 6P. 4A. 2A., short stories, Martigues, France, Éditions Contre-pied, 1994, 26 p. 
 Rai-de-cœur, Paris, Éditions P.O.L, 1996, 106 p. 
 Tout ce qui brille, Éditions P.O.L, 1997, 118 p. 
 Pauvres morts, Éditions P.O.L, 2000, 185 p. 
 Hymen, Éditions P.O.L, 2002, 285 p. 
 Le Triomphe, Éditions P.O.L, 2005, 158 p. 
 Une fille du feu, Éditions P.O.L, 2008, 184 p. 
 La Princesse de, Éditions P.O.L, 2010, 267 p. 
 Si tout n'a pas péri avec mon innocence, Éditions P.O.L, 2013, 448 p. 
 Je viens, Éditions P.O.L, 2015, 464 p.

as Rebecca Lighieri 
 Husbands, novel, Éditions P.O.L, 2013, 448 p. 
 Les Garçons de l'été, novel, Éditions P.O.L, 2017, 448 p. 
 Eden, novel, Medium+, 202 p. 
 Que dire ! (collaborative bande dessinée with Jean-Marc Pontier), Les Enfants Rouges, 2019 
 Il est des Hommes qui se perdront toujours, novel, Éditions P.O.L, 2020, 373 p.

Plays 
 Mon père m'a donné un mari, Éditions P.O.L, 2013, 176 p. 
 À l'abordage !, 2020

Awards 
 2013 – Prix Ouest-France Étonnants Voyageurs for Si tout n'a pas péri avec mon innocence
 2013 – Prix Alexandre-Vialatte for Si tout n'a pas péri avec mon innocence
 2019 – Prix du Livre Inter for Arcadie
 2022 – Prix littéraire des lycéens des Pays de la Loire for Il est des Hommes qui se perdront toujours
 2022 – Prix Médicis for La Treizième Heure

References 

1966 births
Living people
20th-century French writers
21st-century French writers
French women novelists
Prix Médicis winners
Writers from Marseille
Prix du Livre Inter winners